Ernest James "Tubby" Capell (July 1912 – April 1995) was an English amateur cyclist who in 1934 won the British Best All-Rounder competition, by dominating all of the qualifying events - 50 mile, 100 mile and 12 hours. His achievements were further celebrated in 1935 when Cycling Weekly awarded him his own page in the Golden Book of Cycling.

Personal life 
Capell was born in July 1912 in London, England. He married Dora Fenwick in March 1940 and died in Australia in April 1995 at the age of 82.

Career

Competition
In 1934 Capell won the British Best All-Rounder competition, by dominating all of the qualifying distances - 50 mile, 100 mile and 12 hours. In the 'Shaftesbury' 50 mile Time trial he won with a time of 2 hours, 9 minutes, 59 seconds.  He won the 'Bath Road' "100 mile time-trial in 4 hours, 32 minutes, 1 second." Finally he won the Anerley 12-hour race by covering 236¾ miles. He later described his simplistic feeding regime for the Anerley as "... half to three-quarter-pint drink of a milk food at about every 30 miles for the first 150 miles, and at every 20 miles from there to the finish, with a small sandwich of brown bread and a meat extract at every alternate drink."

The Golden Book
Capell's achievements were celebrated in 1935 when Cycling Weekly awarded him his own page in the Golden Book of Cycling.

Cycle touring
Capell was also a photographer. Many of his photographs appeared in English cycling magazines during the 1930s and 1940s.

References

External links
 - Adelaide Touring Cyclists, Nostalgia, Profile of Tubby Capell and collection of his photographs

1912 births
1995 deaths
English male cyclists
Cyclists from Greater London